Miranda Myrat (12 January 1906 – 27 January 1994) was a Greek actress. She appeared in more than forty films from 1928 to 1989. 

She was the daughter of actress Cybele Andrianou (1888-1978) and her first husband Mitsos Myrat. Her mother married thirdly Georgios Papandreou. Miranda's daughter Kyveli Theohari was also an actress.

Selected filmography

References

External links 

1906 births
1994 deaths
Greek film actresses
Actresses from Athens
Greek silent film actresses